HSwMS Gävle (K22) is a Swedish Navy , named after the Swedish city of Gävle.

Development and design 
The Göteborg class is a class of corvettes in the Swedish Navy, built between 1986 and 1993. The class was originally designed to destroy Soviet submarines and surface vessels, and is armed with eight RBS-15 anti-ship missiles, torpedoes, one 57 mm cannon and one 40 mm cannon.

 and Gävle will receive modification in 2019–2020. After the modification the corvettes were named the Gävle class.

Construction and career 
The ship was launched on 23 March 1990 at Karlskrona and entered naval service on 17 September 1990.

Together with its sister ship Sundsvall, they took part in the United Nations operation off the coast of Lebanon following the 2006 war between Israel and Hezbollah.

Mid-life upgrade 
In June 2017 Saab signed a 1.249BSEK contract for life extension modification and upgrading of the Swedish Navy's Gävle and Sundsvall. Gävle was relaunched into water in September 2020 and the work on began on commissioning platform systems
In May 2022 Swedish Defence Materiel Administration delivered the upgraded Gävle to the Swedish Navy. The upgrade included a new torpedo guidance system, Bofors 57 mm Mk3B gun, variable depth sonar (VDS), new sensors, all integrated Combat Management System,integrated IFF-system,  AMB 3D radar similar to the one in use on the s. After the MLU the ships were no longer considered part of the Göteborg class but a new class, designated the Gävle class.

"It is a do over and modernisation of everything on board: She will have the same hull, but more or less all the systems on the inside are new", said Johan Edelsvärd, Project Manager for the Mid-Life Upgrade of HSwMS Gävle at FMV (Swedish Defence Materiel Administration).

On 13 May 2022, Gävle took part in a PASSEX training with the Finnish and the American navies in the northern Baltic Sea.

References 

Göteborg-class corvettes
Corvettes of Sweden
1990 ships
Ships built in Sweden